Daniel Turner (born July 22, 1983) is an American artist based in New York City. His media include sculpture, photography, video and drawing.

Early life and work 
Daniel Turner studied painting and printmaking at Norfolk State University and received a B.F.A. from San Francisco Art Institute. Turner worked in construction and demolition before being employed as a security guard at The New Museum in New York City. He was hospitalized several times for psychosis resulting in an action titled, Burning an Entire Body of Work (2006) in which he burned all previous paintings to date. Turner now works primarily in sculpture often involving the creation or transformation of materials, objects and environments into architectural or ephemeral forms. His sculptures are often characterized by a specific response to site under a controlled set of processes. This approach has enabled Turner to base form on transposition, preserving a sensory link to geographical locations, cultural associations and human contact. These elements are present in works where an entire waiting room is cast into a series of solid bars, a former psychiatric facility burnished to a darkened stain against a wall, or a cafeteria dissolved across the expanse of a floor. In 2019, Turner extracted one metric ton of hospital beds from The Vinnitsa Regional Psychoneurological Hospital in Vinnitsa Ukraine which were archived, melted and recast into two solid forms.. For his solo exhibition at Kunsthalle Basel (2022), the artist extracted elements from three sites in the Basel region that triangulate between architecture, the pharmaceutical industry, and psychology. These materials included several tons of heating radiators and oil tanks which the artist removed from the interiors of the chemical plant BASF, the pharmaceutical labs of Novartis, and former psychiatric facility Holdenweild. Material excavated from each of the three sites were melted into minimal forms and burnished into the surface of large scale works on canvas.

Awards 
 The Virginia Museum of Fine Arts Fellowship Award 2004
The Virginia Museum of Fine Arts Fellowship Award 2005
 The Pollock-Krasner Foundation Award 2018–2019.
The Virginia Museum of Fine Arts Fellowship Award 2009
 The Future Generation Art Prize Award (shortlist) 2019
 The Borlem Prize 2021
 The Pollock-Krasner Foundation Award 2022

Residencies and teaching 
Turner has participated in artist residencies including Hauser & Wirth, Bruton, England, Le Confort Moderne, Poitiers, France, Chinati Foundation, Marfa, Texas, and The Lower Manhattan Cultural Council, New York, NY. Turner served as a guest scholar at New York University, The Syracuse University School of Art, The Maryland Institute College of Art, The San Francisco Art Institute and The Old Dominion Fine art University.

Selected exhibitions 
 Three Sites, (2022), Kunsthalle Basel, Basel, Switzerland
 Humpty Dumpty, (2022), Palais de Tokyo, Paris, France 
 Daniel Turner, (2021), The Maria Leuff Foundation, Columbia County, New York
Moments Between Events, Anne Appleby, Vija Celmins, On Kawara, Daniel Turner, (2021) Franklin Parrasch Gallery, New York NY
Like The Wall Awaiting The Ivy, (2021), Musée des Arts Contemporains Grand Hornu, Honru, Belgium
Recent Acquisitions, (2020), Musée d’art Moderne de la ville de Paris, Paris, France
 Platform: Paris/Brussels, (2020), David Zwirner Gallery, New York NY
 The Extreme Present, (2019) Gagosian Gallery, The Moore Building, Miami, Florida
 Les Abeilles de l'Invisible, (2019), Musée des Arts Contemporains Grand Hornu, Honru, Belgium
 Parcours, (2019), Art Basel, Basel Switzerland  
 Future Generation Art Prize, (2019), Pinchuk Art Center, Kiev Ukraine 
Anne Truitt / Daniel Turner, (2018), Parrasch Heijnen Gallery, Los Angeles, CA
 IPN (2018), Confort Moderne, Poitiers, France
 Daniel Turner, (2018), Galerie Allen, Paris France
 EMP Step, (2017), Eleven Madison Park ,  New York, NY
 Particle Processed Cafeteria, (2016), König Galerie, St. Agnes Nave, Berlin, Germany
 110/ 120, (2016), Franklin Parrasch Gallery, New York, NY
 Daniel Turner, (2016), Parrasch Heijnen Gallery, Los Angeles
 Pilage / Fold, (2014), Gagosian Gallery, Paris, France
Clear,  (2014), Gagosian Gallery, Los Angeles, CA
Freezer Burn, (2014), Hauser & Wirth, New York, NY
Daniel Turner, (2014) Art Unlimited, Basel Switzerland
PM, (2014), Team Gallery, New York, NY
2 220, (2014), Objectif Exhibitions, Antwerp, Belgium
 John McCracken / Daniel Turner, (2012), Franklin Parrasch Gallery, New York, NY
Daniel Turner, (2012), White Cube, London, England
New York: Directions, Points of Interest, (2012), Massimo De Carlo, Milan, Italy 
Modern Talking, (2012), Muzeul National de Arta din Cluj-Napoca, Cluj, Romania
 Daniel Turner, (2012), The Journal Gallery, Brooklyn NY
 Painting Overall, (2011), The Prague Biennale 5, Prague Czech Republic 
Four Rooms, (2011), The Centre for Contemporary Art Ujazdowski Castle, Warsaw, Poland
 Perfect Man II, (2011), White Columns, New York, NY

Public Collections 

 Centre Pompidou, Paris, France 
 Kunst Museum, Basel, Switzerland
 The Stedelijk Museum voor Actuele Kunst, Ghent, Belgium
 Musée d'art Moderne de la ville de Paris, France
 The Museum of Contemporary Art San Diego, California
 FRAC Bretagne Fond Régional d'art Contemporain, France
 ICA Institute of Contemporary Art Miami, Florida
 Sammlung Hauser & Wirth, Henau, Switzerland
 Mona, Tasmania, Australia 
 FRAC Ile-de-France, France
The Maria Leuff Foundation, New York 
Musée des Arts Contemporains Grand Hornu, Honru, Belgium

Publications  
 Daniel Turner, essay by Elena Filipovic, published by The Borlem Prize
 Three Movements (Bronze), essay by Roberto Toscano, Jack Self, Brad Wearstler, published by Karma Books
 5150, essay by Jeffrey Grunthaner, published by American Art Catalogues
 Marjorie, published by Etudes Books
2 220, published by Karma Books
 Daniel Turner, essay by Franciska Zolyom, published by White Cube Gallery
 Daniel Turner, essay by Jeffrey Grunthaner, published by Franklin Parrasch Gallery

Personal life 
Turner is married to fellow artist Rita Ackermann.

References

External links 

1983 births
Living people
Artists from Virginia
Artists from New York City
People from Portsmouth, Virginia
San Francisco Art Institute alumni